Paulinho Nogueira (Campinas, 8 October 1929 – São Paulo, 2 August 2003) was a Brazilian guitarist, composer and singer.

Biography 
He was an eclectic composer, his influences ranging from bossa nova to Bach. Paulinho Nogueira designed the craviola, a guitar with a sloping bout and offset body shape. He was the teacher of Toquinho.

Craviola
The Craviola is an acoustic guitar designed by Paulinho Nogueira and built by manufacturer Giannini.

Craviolas have a distinct asymmetric body shape that deviates from the upper and lower bouts of classical guitars. Its timbre is said to resemble a combination of sounds from a harpsichord and a viola caipira, hence the portmanteau (Cravo is the Portuguese word for harpsichord).

Craviolas can be six-string or twelve-string (either nylon or steel) and are produced solely by Giannini.

Discography
 A voz do violão (1959) Columbia  
 Brasil, violão e sambalanço (1960) RGE  
 Menino desce daí/Tema do boneco de palha (1961) RGE 78 
 Sambas de ontem e de hoje (1961) RGE  
 Outros sambas de ontem e de hoje (1962) RGE  
 Mais sambas de ontem e de hoje (1963) RGE  
 A nova bossa é violão (1964) RGE  
 O fino do violão (1965) RGE  
 Sambas e marchas da nova geração (1966) RGE  
 Paulinho Nogueira (1967) RGE  
 Um festival de violão (1968) RGE  
 Isto É Sambalanço (1969) SBA  
 Paulinho Nogueira canta suas composições (1970) RGE  
 Dez bilhões de neurônios (1972) Continental  
 Paulinho Nogueira, violão e samba (1973) Continental 10.108 
 Simplesmente (1974) Continental  
 Moda de craviola (1975) Continental  
 Antologia do violão (1976) Phonogram  
 Nas asas do moinho (1979) Alequim  
 O fino do violão volume 2 (1980) Bandeirantes/WEA  
 Tom Jobim – Retrospectiva (1981) Cristal/WEA  
 Água branca (1983) Eldorado  
 Tons e semitons (1986) Independente  
 Late night guitar – The Brazilian sound of Paulinho Nogueira (1992)  
 Coração violão (1995) Movieplay  
 Brasil musical – Série música viva – Paulinho Nogueira e Alemã (1996) Tom Brasil  
 Sempre amigos (1999) Movieplay  
 Reflexões (1999) Malandro Records
 Toquinho Paulinho Nogueira (1998), with Toquinho
 Chico Buarque – Primeiras composições (2002) Trama

Bibliography 
  Gildo De Stefano, Il popolo del samba: la vicenda e i protagonisti della Música popular brasileira, Prefazione di Chico Buarque, RAI Editions, Rome 2005 
 Gildo De Stefano, Saudade Bossa Nova: musiche, contaminazioni e ritmi del Brasile, Prefazione di Chico Buarque, Introduzione di Gianni Minà, Logisma Editore, Firenze 2017,

References

1929 births
2003 deaths
Bossa nova guitarists
Columbia Records artists
Malandro Records artists
20th-century guitarists